Penzance RFC formed in 1876, was a rugby union club based in Penzance, Cornwall, England. They amalgamated with Newlyn RFC in 1944 to form Penzance and Newlyn RFC (The Pirates), currently known as the Cornish Pirates.

History

1870–1914
The first recorded rugby match in Penzance is from 1870, played in the grounds of Poltair House, Heamoor and organised by W Borlase of Marlborough School. The Penzance team was mostly public schoolboys, home on holiday, and the opponents the Eastern Telegraph Company based in Porthcurno. 
The club, formed in 1876, played for a few seasons, did not flourish and was restarted in 1883, by J B Cornish who acted as secretary, treasurer and captain. The club initially played in claret and blue but soon changed to black and white in varying styles. Fixtures in their first season (1877–78) included Redruth (possibly the first opponents), Hayle and Lelant and the club won all their matches with only one try was scored against them. At the 1878 AGM it was stated that it would be desirable if all the players should wear the same colour jerseys!

Arthur Trounson (full back) was the first player to win a Cornwall cap when picked to play in the first (recorded) match against Devon, at Plymouth on 12 January 1894, which was lost by two goals and three tries. Club captain Cornish was to win the first of his six caps, a year later, in 1885 and captained Cornwall on two occasions in 1886–87 and 1889–90. Success finally came to the club, fourteen years after they were founded, when the Cornwall Rugby Cup was won in two consecutive seasons (1896–97 and 1897–98); the second one unbeaten against Cornish clubs. By now the Cornwall selectors were increasingly picking Penzance players for Cornwall; on one occasion five players playing in the same match. By the Great War, thirty-eight different Penzance RFC players had represented Cornwall winning over two hundred caps between them.

1920–1945
Fixtures between Penzance and Newlyn were hotly contested and sometimes suspended. Between 1929 and 1932 matches between the clubs were cancelled, a big loss of income to both clubs and one they could not afford. In 1930 the club had a deficit of £58 for the season, in 1933 a balance of 1/3d and by 1936 there was a vote on whether Penzance RFC should continue. The club did continue and so did the poor finances and at the 1939 AGM the club had only 17 shillings. Suggestions of an amalgamation with Newlyn were considered premature by that club and the start of the Second World War put an end to club rugby for a few years. In November 1944, after a public meeting, Newlyn RFC agreed to hold talks with Penzance RFC with a view to amalgamation. A subsequent Penzance RFU committee meeting on 21 November agreed to wind up the rugby club; and at a public meeting at the Guildhall on 12 December 1944 it was agreed to start a new club. Penzance-Nelwyn RFC was born.

Honours
 Cornwall Senior Rugby Table winners (4): 1896–97, 1897–98, 1898–99, 1903–04

Playing record

Grounds
A number of playing fields were used around Penzance including the a field at Trereife (from November 1886), Alexandra Grounds, Coombe Lane (Heamoor), St Just Road (Alverton) - until April 1905, and St Clare from the start of the 1905–06 season. Finally in January 1934 a sub-committee was formed to negotiate with the Borough Council the use of the Mennaye Fields as a rugby ground.

Internationals

Barrie Bennetts
It is considered a great honour to be invited to play for the Barbarians and in 1908 Barrie Bennetts was invited to join the annual tour to South Wales playing against Penarth and Cardiff.
 A year later he was capped twice by England and in 1909 selected to join John Raphael's, 1910 Combined British team's tour of Argentina, playing in Argentina's first international test. An injury robbed him of the chance to play in the 1908 Olympics when Cornwall, as County Champions, represented Great Britain in the games.

Combined British Team to Argentina
 Barrie B Bennetts

England
 Barrie B Bennetts

Cornwall
Fifty-two players from Penzance RFC were picked to represent Cornwall with six of them going on to be captain.

Key: Name in gold indicates the player captained Cornwall on at least one occasion

Other Penzance teams
 Abbey School Football Club – played in 1879
 Causewayhead United – played in the Town rugby cup
 St John's Bible Class – played in 1898
 Black Watch (1 drop goal, 2 tries, 10 pts) beat Scarlet Runners (2 tries, 6pts) in the replayed tie of the 1902 Penzance Junior Town Cup.

See also

 Newlyn RFC
 Cornish Pirates

References

External links
 Penzance RFC history
 Cornish Pirates home page

Cornish Pirates
Cornish rugby union teams
Rugby clubs established in 1876
Sport in Penzance
1876 establishments in England